Dunkwa United is a Ghanaian professional football team that plays in the 2 Zone of the Ghana Division One League. The team changed its name to Pacific Heroes F.C. after the team relocated to Asante Akyem Agogo under a new management through the leadership of business tycoon Eric Oppong Yeboah  Zone 2A has seven competing teams from the part of the Ashanti Region, Western Region and the Central Region of Ghana.

References

Football clubs in Ghana